The Gaumont Finchley was an architecturally notable cinema in north Finchley, London. It opened in 1937 and closed in 1980, before being demolished in 1987.

History
The Gaumont was designed by W. E. Trent, architect the Gaumont British Picture Corporation, with the assistance of his son W. Sydney Trent and R. Golding, and built by McLaughlin & Harvey. The electrical engineer was S. Hart. It was opened by the mayor of Finchley in 1937 and closed in 1980. It was demolished in 1987 and replaced by the Finchley artsdepot.

See also
 Apollo Victoria Theatre, another W.E. Trent design.
 Phoenix Cinema, East Finchley, a nearby Art Deco cinema.

References

External links 

Finchley
Art Deco architecture in London
Buildings and structures completed in 1937
Former cinemas in London
Buildings and structures demolished in 1987